Evgeni Stanislavovich Semenenko (born 26 July 2003) is a Russian figure skater. He is the 2021 Skate Canada bronze medalist and the 2023 Russian national champion. He placed in the top eight at the 2021 World Championships. He was the best result of Russia at 2022 Winter Olympics, placing 8th all-around. On the junior level, he is the 2021 Russian junior national champion.

Programs

Competitive highlights 
GP: Grand Prix; JGP: Junior Grand Prix

Detailed results
Small medals for short and free programs awarded only at ISU Championships. At team events, medals awarded for team results only.

Senior level

ISU Personal Bests highlighted in bold.

References

External links 
 
 

2003 births
Living people
Russian male single skaters
Figure skaters from Saint Petersburg
Figure skaters at the 2022 Winter Olympics
Olympic figure skaters of Russia